Second Chapter is the debut solo album by British blues rock musician Danny Kirwan, released in 1975 on the DJM Records label. This was his first solo album after being dismissed from Fleetwood Mac in 1972, and his solo career was being managed by ex-Mac manager Clifford Davis.

Demo tracks for this album were released on CD in 2000 as Ram Jam City.

Reception

Allmusic critic Joe Viglione declared that Second Chapter was a feather in the cap for Kirwan as well as producer Martin Rushent. Drawing comparisons with the music of Lindsey Buckingham, Paul McCartney and America, he highlighted the title track, "Love Can Always Bring You Happiness" and "Silver Streams" as the best tracks. He also stated that the album shows Kirwan's importance as a pop artist, and that Fleetwood Mac would have benefitted from his presence in their very successful mid-70s line-up.

Track listing
All songs written by Danny Kirwan

Side One
"Ram Jam City" – 2:48
"Odds and Ends" – 2:31
"Hot Summer Day" – 2:40
"Mary Jane" – 2:54
"Skip a Dee Doo" – 2:39
"Love Can Always Bring You Happiness" – 3:12

Side Two
"Second Chapter" – 3:24
"Lovely Days" – 2:26
"Falling in Love With You" – 2:16
"Silver Streams" – 3:27
"Best Girl in the World" – 2:31
"Cascades" – 3:10

Album variations
On some versions, "Hot Summer Day" was shown as "Hot Summer's Day".
"Best Girl in the World" was left off the US version of the album.  However, it appeared on the B-side of a 1976 US single featuring the 1969 Fleetwood Mac recording "Man of the World" on the A-side.

Personnel
Danny Kirwan – guitars, vocals
Andy Silvester – bass guitar
Paul Raymond – piano
Geoff Britton – drums
Jim Russell – drums, percussion
Gerry Shury – string arrangements

Production
Producer / engineer – Martin Rushent
Photography & album co-ordination – Clifford Davis
Sleeve design – McKinley Howell & J.M. Heale

Release information
UK – DJM DJPLS454 (LP) / DJM DJH40454 (cassette) – 12 September 1975
USA – DJM DJLPA-1 – 1975 (LP & cassette), distributed by Amherst Records
Japan – 
DJM IFS 80431 – 1975 (LP)
AMR Archive AIRAC-1175 – 22 February 2006 (CD)
Germany – Repertoire REP 4370-WP – 1993 (CD)

The UK and US LP releases came in a gatefold sleeve, and the Japanese CD release came in a cardboard sleeve.

References

Danny Kirwan albums
1975 debut albums
Albums produced by Martin Rushent
DJM Records albums